is a 1988 Japanese horror film directed by Toshiki Satô.

Plot

Cast

References

External links
 

1988 films
1988 horror films
1980s pornographic films
1980s Japanese-language films
Films set in Japan
Japanese horror films
Japanese pornographic films
Pornographic horror films
1980s Japanese films